Metapa may refer to:
Metapa (Greece), an ancient town of Greece
Metapa, Chiapas, Mexico
Metapa, former name of Ciudad Darío, in Matagalpa department, Nicaragua